The 16337 / 16338 Ernakulam–Okha Express also called as Okha Express is bi-weekly Express train running between the cities of Kochi in Kerala and Okha in Gujarat. It mainly connects the people of Kerala living in Saurashtra region. It mainly runs and serve the people of the states of Goa, Maharashtra, Karnataka, Gujarat and Kerala.  The time table of the train is amended during monsoon season and the train reaches  late by 2 to 3 hours of the original time but the monsoon time table does not affects its return journey. Few years before during monsoon season the train had its service only till Hapa but after that during monsoon also the train run till Okha.

The train first used  to run between Cochin and Ahmedabad as Cochin–Ahmedabad Express and then it was extended up to  making it Cochin–Rajkot Express. During that time the train used to start from Cochin Harbour Terminus station. At that time the train had a single service in a week. After Ernakulam Junction railway station was developed the train's origin was shifted to Ernakulam Junction. One more train was introduced after which train had bi-weekly service.

Coach composition

The train has standard ICF rakes with max speed of 110 kmph. The train consists of 23 coaches:

 1 AC II Tier
 3 AC III Tier
 13 Sleeper coaches
 3 General Unreserved
 2 Seating cum Luggage Rake
 1 Pantry Car

Service

16337/ Okha–Ernakulam Express has an average speed of 53 km/hr and covers 2250 km in 41 hrs 10 mins.

16338/ Ernakulam–Okha Express has an average speed of 50 km/hr and covers 2250 km in 44 hrs 15 mins.

Route & Halts

The important halts of the train are:

Schedule

Traction

Both trains are hauled by a Ernakulam-based WDM-3A twins locomotive on its entire journey.

See also

 Ernakulam railway station
 Okha railway station
 Netravati Express

References

Transport in Okha
Transport in Kochi
Rail transport in Kerala
Rail transport in Gujarat
Express trains in India
Rail transport in Maharashtra
Rail transport in Goa
Rail transport in Karnataka
Konkan Railway